Thomas Villiers, 2nd Earl of Clarendon (25 December 1753 – 7 March 1824), known as Lord Hyde from 1776 to 1786, was a British peer and Tory Member of Parliament from the Villiers family.

Life
Clarendon was the eldest son of Thomas Villiers, 1st Earl of Clarendon and his wife Lady Charlotte Capell, and was educated at Eton and St John's College, Cambridge.

He was elected to the House of Commons for Christchurch in 1774, a seat he held until 1780. He later represented Helston between 1781 and 1786, when he succeeded his father in the earldom and entered the House of Lords.

He served as a Cornet in the Western Troop, Hertfordshire Yeomanry, under the command of his younger brother George, and when George resigned he was promoted to Captain to command in his place.

Lord Clarendon died in March 1824, aged 70. He never married and was succeeded in his titles by his younger brother John Charles Villiers.

He lived at The Grove, a country house near Watford, Hertfordshire.

Notes

References 
 Kidd, Charles, Williamson, David (editors). Debrett's Peerage and Baronetage (1990 edition). New York: St Martin's Press, 1990, 
 
 
 Lt-Col J.D. Sainsbury, The Hertfordshire Yeomanry: An Illustrated History 1794–1920, Welwyn: Hart Books/Hertfordshire Yeomanry and Artillery Historical Trust, 1994, ISBN 0-948527-03-X,

External links

1753 births
1824 deaths
2
British MPs 1774–1780
British MPs 1780–1784
British MPs 1784–1790
People educated at Eton College
Alumni of St John's College, Cambridge
Hertfordshire Yeomanry officers
Thomas Villiers, 2nd Earl of Clarendon
Members of the Parliament of Great Britain for English constituencies
Members of the Parliament of Great Britain for Helston